The following is the list of squads for each of the 16 teams that competed in the men's basketball tournament at the 1964 Summer Olympics.

Group A

Canada

The following players represented Canada:

 Barry Howson
 Fred Ingaldson
 George Stulac
 James Maguire
 John McKibbon
 Joseph Stulac
 Keith Hartley
 Ruby Richman
 Rolly Goldring
 Walter Birtles
 Warren Reynolds

Hungary

The following players represented Hungary:

 András Haán
 Árpád Glatz
 György Pólik
 János Bencze
 János Greminger
 János Rácz
 József Prieszol
 László Gabányi
 Miklós Boháty
 Ödön Lendvay
 Pál Koczka
 Tibor Kangyal

Italy

The following players represented Italy:

 Augusto Giomo
 Franco Bertini
 Gabriele Vianello
 Gianfranco Lombardi
 Gianfranco Pieri
 Gianfranco Sardagna
 Giovanni Gavagnin
 Giusto Pellanera
 Massimo Masini
 Ottorino Flaborea
 Paolo Vittori
 Sauro Bufalini

Japan

The following players represented Japan:

 Akira Kodama
 Fumihiko Moroyama
 Kaoru Wakabayashi
 Katsuji Tsunoda
 Katsuo Bai
 Kunihiko Nakamura
 Masashi Shiga
 Nobuo Kaiho
 Seiji Fujie
 Setsuo Nara
 Takashi Masuda
 Yoshitaka Egawa

Mexico

The following players represented Mexico:

 Alberto Almanza
 Armando Herrera
 Carlos Quintanar
 Eulalio Avila
 Luis Grajeda
 Manuel Raga
 Mario Peña
 Miguel Arellano
 Rafael Heredia
 Rico Pontvianne

Poland

The following players represented Poland:

 Andrzej Perka
 Andrzej Pstrokoński
 Bohdan Likszo
 Janusz Wichowski
 Jerzy Piskun
 Kazimierz Frelkiewicz
 Krystian Czernichowski
 Krzysztof Sitkowski
 Mieczysław Łopatka
 Stanisław Olejniczak
 Tadeusz Blauth
 Zbigniew Dregier

Puerto Rico

The following players represented Puerto Rico:

 Alberto Zamot
 Ángel Cancel
 Ángel García
 Evelio Droz
 Jaime Frontera
 Juan Vicéns
 Juan Báez
 Martín Ansa
 Rubén Adorno
 Teo Cruz
 Tomás Gutiérrez
 Bill McCadney

Soviet Union

The following players represented the Soviet Union:

 Jānis Krūmiņš
 Valdis Muižnieks
 Mykola Bahlei
 Armenak Alachachian
 Aleksandr Travin
 Vyacheslav Khrynin
 Levan Moseshvili
 Yuri Korneev
 Aleksandr Petrov
 Gennady Volnov
 Jaak Lipso
 Juris Kalniņš

Group B

Australia

The following players represented Australia:

 Brendon Hackwill
 Carl Rodwell
 John Gardiner
 John Heard
 Ken Cole
 László Hódi
 Lindsay Gaze
 Michael Ah Matt
 Mike Dancis
 Scott Davie
 Werner Linde
 Bill Wyatt

Brazil

The following players represented Brazil:

 Amaury
 Wlamir Marques
 Bira
 Mosquito
 Jatyr
 Rosa Branca
 Edson Bispo
 Sucar
 Fritz
 Victor Mirshauswka
 Sérgio Macarrão
 Edvar Simões

Finland

The following players represented Finland:

 Jorma Pilkevaara
 Juha Harjula
 Kari Liimo
 Kauko Kauppinen
 Martti Liimo
 Pertti Laanti
 Raimo Lindholm
 Raimo Vartia
 Risto Kala
 Teijo Finneman
 Timo Lampén
 Uolevi Manninen

Peru

The following players represented Peru:

 Carlos Vásquez
 Enrique Duarte
 Jorge Vargas
 José Guzmán
 Luis Duarte
 Manuel Valerio
 Óscar Benalcázar
 Óscar Sevilla
 Raúl Duarte
 Ricardo Duarte
 Simón Peredes
 Tomás Sangio

South Korea

The following players represented South Korea:

 Bang Yeol
 Jeong Jin-bong
 Ha Ui-geon
 Kim Jong-seon
 Kim In-geon
 Kim Mu-hyeon
 Kim Seung-gyu
 Kim Yeong-il
 Kim Yeong-gi
 Lee Byeong-gu
 Mun Hyeon-jang
 Sin Dong-pa

United States

The following players represented the United States:

 Jim Barnes
 Bill Bradley
 Larry Brown
 Joe Caldwell
 Mel Counts
 Dick Davies
 Walt Hazzard
 Luke Jackson
 Pete McCaffrey
 Jeff Mullins
 Jerry Shipp
 Jiff Wilson

Uruguay

The following players represented Uruguay:

 Alvaro Roca
 Edison Ciavattone
 Jorge Maya
 Julio César Gómez
 Luis García
 Luis Koster
 Manuel Gadea
 Ramiro de León
 Sergio Pisano
 Waldemar Rial
 Walter Márquez
 Washington Poyet

Yugoslavia

The following players represented Yugoslavia:

References

1964 Summer Olympics